The Normal Album is the third studio album by American musician Will Wood, released on July 10, 2020, by Say-10 Records. The album was financed in part by a crowdfunding campaign, which met its goal in its first day.

Release
The Normal Album was partly financed by a crowdfunding campaign on Indiegogo, as well as by subscribers to Will Wood's Patreon page. The Indiegogo campaign reached its funding goal within a day of its launch, and went on to raise nearly $28,000.

The tracks "Love, Me Normally", "Laplace's Angel (Hurt People? Hurt People!)", and "...well, better than the alternative." were released as singles prior to the release of the album. The album was released on July 10, 2020, through Say-10 Records.

Reception
Jordan Blum of PopMatters wrote that The Normal Album "explores themes of normality, identity, morality, and other psychological traits", and called it "a thrilling mix of genres (jazz, new wave, doo-wop, and disco among them)"; Blum highlighted the song "BlackBoxWarrior – OKULTRA" as being "a great glimpse into Wood's bold and brilliant aesthetic." Bleeding Cools Joshua Nelson gave the album a positive review, noting the "sardonic bite" and varying moods of its tracks.

Track listing

Personnel

Adapted from the album's liner notes.
 Will Wood – piano and keyboards, vocals, ukulele, marimba, glockenspiel
 Matt Berger – alto saxophone, clarinet, flute; bass vocals on "Suburbia Overture" and "Laplace's Angel"
 Vater Boris – upright bass, bass guitar
 Mike Bottiglieri – acoustic guitar, electric guitars
 Mario Conte – drums, percussion
 Richard Cush – trombone
 Seamus Roman – baritone saxophone
 Robert Schaefer – trumpet
 Victoria Goettel – viola
 Spencer Daniele – didgeridoo

Production
 Jonathon Maisto – producer
 Kevin Guillorn – additional engineering
 Matt Squire – producer, mixer and engineer (on "Love Me, Normally")

References

2020 albums